Greek Patriarchate may refer to:

 Greek Orthodox Patriarchate of Alexandria, an Eastern Orthodox Patriarchate of Alexandria
 Greek Orthodox Patriarchate of Antioch, an Eastern Orthodox Patriarchate of Antioch
 Greek Orthodox Patriarchate of Constantinople, an Eastern Orthodox Patriarchate of Constantinople
 Greek Orthodox Patriarchate of Jerusalem, an Eastern Orthodox Patriarchate of Jerusalem

See also
 Patriarchate
 Patriarchate of Alexandria (disambiguation)
 Patriarchate of Antioch (disambiguation)
 Patriarchate of Constantinople (disambiguation)
 Patriarchate of Jerusalem (disambiguation)